Naqshbandi Haqqani Sufi Order, stems from the Naqshbandi 'Aliyyah Tariqah. It takes the name "Haqqani" from the tariqah's revivor, Mawláná Shaykh Muḥammad Nazım 'Ádil al-Haqqani. The Naqshbandi-Haqqani Sufi Order of America (NQSOA), is an educational organization devoted to spreading the teachings of the Naqshbandi-Haqqani Sufi tariqah in America, under the guidance of the worldwide leader and master of the order Mehmet 'Ádil ar-Rabbani, Mawláná Shaykh Nazım's successor.

Mission 
According to its official website: "The mission of the Naqshbandi-Haqqani Sufi Order of America is to spread the Sufi teachings of the brotherhood of mankind and the Unity of belief in God that is present in all religions and spiritual paths. Its efforts are directed at bringing the diverse spectrum of religions and spiritual paths into harmony and concord, in recognition of mankind's responsibility as caretaker of this fragile planet and of one another."

Activities 
In spreading the Sufi teachings, NQSOA has employed a variety of means, including a strong web presence, a publications department, and ongoing teaching and worship activities at its 13 centers in America.

See also 
 Naqshbandi-Haqqani Golden Chain

References

External links
 Naqshbandi website
 Naqshbandi-Haqqani Sufi Order website
 Naqshbandi Muhibeen website

Naqshbandi order
Sufism in North America